The Last Sunset may refer to:

 The Last Sunset (album), an album by the band Conception
 The Last Sunset (film), a 1961 western film
 "The Last Sunset" (Space: 1999), an episode of the British TV series Space: 1999